Sanford Koufax (born Sanford Braun; December 30, 1935) is an American former left-handed pitcher in Major League Baseball (MLB) who played his entire career for the Brooklyn/Los Angeles Dodgers from 1955 to 1966. He has been hailed as one of the greatest pitchers in baseball history. After joining the major leagues at age 19, having never pitched a game in the minor leagues, the first half of his career was unremarkable, posting a record of just 36–40 with a 4.10 earned run average (ERA); he was a member of World Series champions in both Brooklyn and Los Angeles, though he did not appear in any of the team's Series wins. But after making adjustments prior to the 1961 season, and benefitting from the team's move into expansive Dodger Stadium a year later, Koufax quickly rose to become the most dominant pitcher in the major leagues before arthritis in his left elbow ended his playing days prematurely at age 30.

Koufax was an All-Star in each of his last six seasons, leading the National League (NL) in ERA each of his last five years, in strikeouts four times, in wins and shutouts three times each, and in winning percentage, innings pitched and complete games twice each; he was the first NL pitcher in 20 years to post an ERA below 2.00, doing so three times. In  he set a major league record with 382 strikeouts; it was broken in 1973 by Nolan Ryan, but remains the top mark for NL pitchers and left-handers. He was the first pitcher to record 300 strikeouts three times, and set a record with 97 games of at least 10 strikeouts, also later broken by Ryan; he twice tied a modern record by striking out 18 batters in a game. He was also named the NL Most Valuable Player (MVP) in 1963, and was runner-up for the award the other two years.

Koufax was the first major league pitcher to hurl four no-hitters, and in 1965 became the eighth pitcher and the first left-hander since 1880 to pitch a perfect game. He was named the World Series MVP in both 1963 and 1965, earning two wins in each Series and striking out 52 batters to lead the team to another pair of titles. He is also notable for being one of the outstanding Jewish athletes in U.S. sports; Koufax's decision not to pitch Game 1 of the 1965 World Series because it fell on the Jewish holiday Yom Kippur garnered national attention as a conflict between religious calling and society, and remains a notable event in U.S. Jewish history. Upon his retirement, Koufax's career ERA of 2.76 trailed only Whitey Ford among pitchers with at least 2,000 innings pitched since 1925; his .655 winning percentage ranked third among both left-handers and modern NL pitchers. Despite his comparatively short career, his 2,396 career strikeouts ranked seventh in major league history, trailing only Warren Spahn (2,583) among left-handers; his 40 shutouts were tied for ninth in modern NL history. He was the first pitcher in history to average more than one strikeout per inning, and the first to allow fewer than seven hits per nine innings pitched. Koufax briefly held the Dodgers records for career strikeouts and shutouts until longtime teammate Don Drysdale passed him in 1968. Koufax was inducted into the Baseball Hall of Fame in his first year of eligibility in 1972, becoming at age 36 the youngest player ever elected. He has since worked for the Dodgers organization in a variety of capacities.

Early life
Koufax was born in Brooklyn, New York, to a Jewish family and was raised in Borough Park. His parents, Evelyn (née Lichtenstein) and Jack Braun, divorced when he was three years old. His mother was remarried when he was nine, to Irving Koufax. Shortly after his mother's remarriage, the family moved to the Long Island suburb of Rockville Centre. Before tenth grade, Koufax's family moved back to the Bensonhurst section of Brooklyn. Koufax attended Brooklyn's Lafayette High School, where he was better known for basketball than for baseball. He started playing basketball for the Edith and Carl Marks Jewish Community House of Bensonhurst local community center team. Eventually, Lafayette had a basketball team; Koufax became team captain in his senior year, and ranked second in his division in scoring, with 165 points in 10 games. In 1951, at the age of 15, Koufax also joined a local youth baseball league known as the "Ice Cream League". He started out as a left-handed catcher before moving to first base. While playing first base for Lafayette's baseball team with his friend Fred Wilpon, he was spotted by Milt Laurie, a baseball coach who was the father of two Lafayette players. Laurie recognized that Koufax might be able to pitch, and recruited the 17-year-old to pitch for the Coney Island Sports League's Parkviews.

Koufax attended the University of Cincinnati and was a walk-on on the freshman basketball team, a complete unknown to assistant coach Ed Jucker. He later earned a partial scholarship. In spring 1954, he made the college baseball varsity team, which was coached by Jucker at that time. In his only season, Koufax went 3–1 with a 2.81 ERA, 51 strikeouts and 30 walks in 32 innings. Bill Zinser, a scout for the Brooklyn Dodgers, sent the Dodgers front office a glowing report that apparently was filed and forgotten.

After trying out with the New York Giants at the Polo Grounds, Koufax did the same for the Pittsburgh Pirates at Forbes Field. During his Pirates tryout, his fastball broke the thumb of Sam Narron, the team's bullpen coach. Branch Rickey, then the general manager of the Pirates, told his scout Clyde Sukeforth that Koufax had the "greatest arm [he had] ever seen". The Pirates, however, failed to offer Koufax a contract until after he was already committed to the Dodgers. Dodgers scout Al Campanis heard about Koufax from Jimmy Murphy, a part-time scout. After seeing Koufax pitch for Lafayette, Campanis invited him to an Ebbets Field tryout. With Dodgers manager Walter Alston and scouting director Fresco Thompson watching, Campanis assumed the hitter's stance while Koufax started throwing. Campanis later said, "There are two times in my life the hair on my arms has stood up: The first time I saw the ceiling of the Sistine Chapel and the second time, I saw Sandy Koufax throw a fastball." The Dodgers signed Koufax for a $6,000 ($ today) salary, with a $14,000 ($ today) signing bonus. Koufax planned to use the money as tuition to finish his university education, if his baseball career failed.

Professional career

Early years (1955–1960)

Because Koufax's signing bonus was greater than $4,000 ($ today), he was known as a bonus baby. This forced the Dodgers to keep him on the major league roster for at least two years before he could be sent to the minors. To make room for him, the Dodgers optioned their future Hall of Fame manager, Tommy Lasorda, to the Montreal Royals of the International League. Lasorda would later joke that it took Koufax to keep him off the Dodger pitching staff. Koufax made his major league debut on June 24, against the Milwaukee Braves, with the Dodgers trailing 7–1 in the fifth inning. Johnny Logan, the first batter Koufax faced, hit a bloop single. Eddie Mathews bunted, and Koufax threw the ball into center field. He then walked Hank Aaron on four pitches to load the bases, but struck out Bobby Thomson on a 3–2 fastball—an outcome Koufax later came to view as "probably the worst thing that could have happened to me," leading, as it did, to five seasons spent "trying to get out of trouble by throwing harder and harder and harder."

Koufax's first start was on July 6. He lasted only  innings, giving up eight walks. He did not start again for almost two months, but on August 27, Koufax threw a two-hit, 7–0 complete game shutout against the Cincinnati Reds for his first major league win. Koufax threw  innings in 12 appearances that season, striking out 30 batters and walking 28. He had two wins in 1955, which were both shutouts. During the fall, he enrolled in the Columbia University School of General Studies, which offered night classes in architecture. The Dodgers won the 1955 World Series for the first title in franchise history, but Koufax did not appear in the series. After the final out of Game 7, Koufax drove to Columbia to attend class.

The year 1956 was not very different from 1955 for Koufax. Despite the blazing speed of his fastball, Koufax continued to struggle with his control. He saw little work, pitching only  innings with a 4.91 ERA, 29 walks and 30 strikeouts. When Koufax allowed baserunners, he was rarely permitted to finish the inning. Teammate Joe Pignatano said that as soon as Koufax threw a couple of balls in a row, Alston would signal for a replacement to start warming up in the bullpen. Jackie Robinson, in his final season, clashed with Alston on Koufax's usage. Robinson saw that Koufax was talented and had flashes of brilliance, and objected to him being benched for weeks at a time.

To prepare for the  season, the Dodgers sent Koufax to Puerto Rico to play winter ball. On May 15, the restriction on sending Koufax down to the minors was lifted. Alston gave him a chance to justify his place on the major league roster by giving him the next day's start. Facing the Chicago Cubs at Wrigley Field, Koufax struck out 13 while pitching his first complete game in almost two years. For the first time in his career, he was in the starting rotation, but only for two weeks. Despite winning three of his next five with a 2.90 ERA, Koufax did not get another start for 45 days. In that start, he struck out 11 in seven innings, but got no decision. On September 29, he became the last man to pitch for the Brooklyn Dodgers before their move to Los Angeles, throwing an inning of relief in the final game of the season. Koufax and fellow Dodgers pitcher Don Drysdale served six months in the United States Army Reserve at Fort Dix in New Jersey after the end of the 1957 season and before spring training in 1958.

Over the next three seasons, Koufax was in and out of the starting rotation due to injuries. In 1958, he began 7–3, but sprained his ankle in a collision at first base, finishing the season at 11–11 and leading the NL in wild pitches. In June 1959, Koufax set the record for a night game with 16 strikeouts. On August 31 against the Giants, he set the NL single-game record and tied Bob Feller's modern major league record of 18, also scoring on Wally Moon's walk-off home run for a 5-2 win.

In , the Dodgers won a close pennant race against the Braves and the Giants, then beat the Chicago White Sox in the World Series. Koufax pitched two perfect relief innings in the Series opener, though they came after the Dodgers were already behind 11–0. Alston gave him the start in Game 5, at the Los Angeles Coliseum in front of 92,706 fans. Koufax allowed only one run in seven innings, but lost the 1–0 game when Nellie Fox scored on a double play. Returning to Chicago, the Dodgers won Game 6 and the Series.

In early , Koufax asked Dodgers general manager Buzzie Bavasi to trade him because he was not getting enough playing time. On May 23, he pitched a 1-0, one-hit shutout in Pittsburgh, allowing only a second-inning single by pitcher Bennie Daniels. By the end of the year, after going 8–13, Koufax was thinking about quitting baseball to devote himself to an electronics business in which he had invested. After the last game of the season, he threw his gloves and spikes into the trash. Nobe Kawano, the clubhouse supervisor, retrieved the equipment in case Koufax returned to play the following year.

Domination (1961–1964)

1961 season

Koufax tried one more year of baseball, showing up for the 1961 season in better condition than he ever had before. Years later he recalled, "That winter was when I really started working out. I started running more. I decided I was really going to find out how good I can be." During spring training, Dodger scout Kenny Myers discovered a hitch in Koufax's windup, where he would rear back so far he would lose sight of the target.

A day later, Koufax was pitching for the "B team" in Orlando. Teammate Ed Palmquist missed the flight, so Koufax was told he would need to pitch at least seven innings. In the first inning, Koufax walked the bases loaded on 12 straight pitches. Catcher Norm Sherry advised him to throw slightly less hard in order to improve his control. The advice worked, Koufax struck out the side, and then went on to pitch seven no-hit innings.

In perhaps an early display of sabermetrics, Dodger statistician Allan Roth is credited with helping Koufax tweak his game in the early 1960s, particularly regarding the importance of first-pitch strikes and the benefits of off-speed pitches.

1961 was Koufax's breakout season. He posted an 18–13 record and led the league with 269 strikeouts, breaking Christy Mathewson's 58-year-old NL mark of 267. Selected as an All-Star for the first time, he appeared in both All-Star Games that year (two All-Star games were held for the years from 1959 to 1962). In the first game he faced only one batter, giving up a hit to Al Kaline in the ninth inning. In the second game, he pitched two scoreless innings.

1962 season
In , the Dodgers moved from the Los Angeles Coliseum, which had a  left-field line – an enormous disadvantage to lefthanded pitchers – to pitcher-friendly Dodger Stadium. The new park had a large foul territory and a comparatively poor hitting background. Koufax was an immediate beneficiary of the change, lowering his ERA at home from 4.29 to 1.75. On April 24, he tied his own record with 18 strikeouts in a 10-2 road win over the Cubs. On June 13 in Milwaukee, Koufax hit the first home run of his career off Warren Spahn, providing the winning margin in a 2-1 victory in Milwaukee. On June 30 against the expansion New York Mets, he threw his first no-hitter. In the first inning of that game he struck out all three batters on nine total pitches to become the sixth recorded National League pitcher and the 11th recorded pitcher in major league history to accomplish an immaculate inning. His no-hitter, along with a 4–2 record, 73 strikeouts and a 1.23 ERA, earned him the Player of the Month Award for June. It would be the only time in his career he earned this distinction.

Koufax had a strong season despite an injured pitching hand. While batting in April, he had been jammed by a pitch from Earl Francis. A numbness developed in the index finger on his left hand, and the finger became cold and white. Koufax was pitching better than ever, however, so he ignored the problem, hoping that the condition would clear up. By July, though, his entire hand was becoming numb and he was unable to complete some games. In a start in Cincinnati his finger split open after one inning. A vascular specialist determined that Koufax had a crushed artery in his palm. Ten days of experimental medicine successfully reopened the artery. Koufax finally was able to pitch again in September, when the team was locked in a tight pennant race with the Giants. But after the long layoff, Koufax was ineffective in three appearances as the Giants caught the Dodgers at the end of the regular season, forcing a three-game playoff.

The night before the playoffs began, manager Alston asked Koufax if he could start the next day. With an overworked pitching staff there was no one else, as Drysdale and Johnny Podres had pitched the prior two days. Koufax obliged. Koufax later said, "I had nothing at all." He was knocked out in the second inning, after giving up home runs to future Hall of Famer Willie Mays and Jim Davenport. After winning the second game of the series, the Dodgers blew a 4–2 lead in the ninth inning of the deciding third game, losing the pennant.

1963 season
In 1963 Major League Baseball expanded the strike zone. Compared to the previous season, walks in the NL fell 13 percent, strikeouts increased 6 percent, the league batting average fell from .261 to .245, and runs scored declined 15 percent. Koufax, who had reduced his walks allowed per nine innings to 3.4 in 1961 and 2.8 in 1962, reduced his walk rate further to 1.7 in 1963, which ranked fifth in the league. The top pitchers of the era – future Hall of Famers Drysdale, Juan Marichal, Jim Bunning, Bob Gibson, Warren Spahn - and above all Koufax – significantly reduced the walks-given-up-to-batters-faced ratio for 1963 and subsequent years.

On May 11 Koufax no-hit the Giants 8–0, besting Marichal—himself a no-hit pitcher on June 15. Koufax carried a perfect game into the eighth inning against the powerful Giants lineup, including Mays and fellow future Hall of Famers Willie McCovey and Orlando Cepeda. He walked Ed Bailey on a 3-and-2 pitch in the eighth, and pinch-hitter McCovey on four pitches in the ninth, before closing out the game. From July 3 to July 16, he pitched 33 consecutive scoreless innings, pitching three shutouts to lower his ERA to 1.65. On July 20 he hit the second and last home run of his career, coincidentally again in Milwaukee, a three-run shot to propel the team to a 5-4 win; it was his only game with three runs batted in. The Dodgers won the pennant, and Koufax won the first of three pitchers' Triple Crowns, leading the league in wins (25), strikeouts (306) and ERA (1.88). He threw 11 shutouts, eclipsing Carl Hubbell's 30-year post-1900 mark for a left-handed pitcher of 10 and setting a record that stands to this day. Only St. Louis Cardinal Bob Gibson, with 13 in his iconic 1968 season, "the year of the pitcher", has thrown more.

Koufax won the NL MVP Award and the Hickok Belt, and was the first-ever unanimous selection for the Cy Young Award. It was not only the first of three times he would be a unanimous selection, it was the only Cy Young Award given out for both leagues during his career; separate awards for each league were presented starting in 1967.

Facing the Yankees in the 1963 World Series, Koufax beat Whitey Ford 5–2 in Game 1 and struck out the first five batters and 15 overall, breaking Carl Erskine's decade-old record of 14 (a record that would fall to Gibson's 17 in the 1968 World Series opener). After seeing Koufax's Game 1 performance, Yankee Yogi Berra said, "I can see how he won 25 games. What I don't understand is how he lost five," to which Dodger shortstop Maury Wills responded, "He didn't. We lost them for him." In Game 4, Koufax completed the Dodgers' series sweep with a 2–1 victory over Ford, clinching the Series MVP Award for his performance.

1964 season
Koufax's  season started with great expectations. On April 18, he struck out three batters on nine pitches in the third inning of a 3–0 loss to the Cincinnati Reds, becoming the only NL pitcher to have two "immaculate innings". On April 22, however, "he felt something let go in his arm," resulting in three cortisone shots for a sore elbow and three missed starts.

On June 4, playing at Connie Mack Stadium against the Philadelphia Phillies, Koufax walked Richie Allen on a very close full-count pitch in the fourth inning. Allen, who was thrown out trying to steal second, was the only Phillie to reach base that day. With his third no-hitter in three years Koufax tied Feller as the only modern-era pitchers to hurl three no-hitters.

Koufax jammed his pitching arm in August while diving back to second base to beat a pick-off throw. He managed to pitch and win two more games. However, the morning after his 19th win, a shutout in which he struck out 13 batters, he could not straighten his arm. He was diagnosed by Dodgers team physician Robert Kerlan with traumatic arthritis. With the Dodgers out of the pennant race he did not pitch again, ending the season with a 19–5 record and leading the NL with a 1.74 ERA.

Playing in pain (1965–66)

1965 season

The 1965 season brought more obstacles for Koufax. On March 31, the morning after pitching a complete spring training game, Koufax awoke to find that his entire left arm was black and blue from hemorrhaging. Koufax returned to Los Angeles to consult with Kerlan, who advised him that he would be lucky to be able to pitch once a week. Kerlan also told Koufax that he would eventually lose full use of his arm. Koufax agreed not to throw at all between games—a resolution that lasted only one start. To get himself through the games he pitched, Koufax resorted to Empirin with codeine for the pain, which he took every night and sometimes during the fifth inning. He also took Butazolidin for inflammation, applied capsaicin-based Capsolin ointment (also sold by the brand name "Atomic Balm") before each game, and soaked his arm in a tub of ice afterwards.

On June 20, in the first game of a doubleheader against the Mets, Koufax pitched his second one-hitter, allowing only a fifth-inning home run by Jim Hickman before the Dodgers came back for a 2-1 win. Despite the constant pain in his pitching elbow, he pitched a major league-leading  innings and led the Dodgers to another pennant. Koufax won his second pitchers' Triple Crown, leading the league in wins (26), ERA (2.04) and strikeouts (382, the highest modern-day total at the time, topped only by Nolan Ryan's 383 in ), and captured his second unanimous Cy Young Award. He held batters to 5.79 hits per nine innings, and allowed the fewest baserunners per nine innings in any season ever: 7.83, breaking his own record (set two years earlier) of 7.96. Koufax had 11-game winning streaks in both 1964 and 1965.

Perfection

On September 9, 1965, Koufax became the sixth pitcher of the modern era, and eighth overall, to throw a perfect game. The game was Koufax's fourth no-hitter, setting a major league record (subsequently broken by Ryan in 1981), and the first by a left-hander since 1880. He struck out 14 batters in the 1–0 win, at the time the most recorded in a perfect game (tied by Matt Cain in 2012). The game also set a record for the fewest hits ever in a major league contest, thanks to a one-hitter thrown by the opposing pitcher, Bob Hendley of the Cubs, who only allowed only two batters to reach base. Both pitchers had no-hitters intact until the seventh inning.

The winning run was unearned, scored without a hit when the Dodger's Lou Johnson walked, reached second on a sacrifice, stole third, and scored on a throwing error by Chicago catcher Chris Krug.

World Series and Yom Kippur
Koufax declined to pitch Game 1 of the 1965 World Series in order to observe the Jewish religious holiday of Yom Kippur. His decision garnered national headlines, raising the conflict between professional pressures and personal religious beliefs to front-page news. Drysdale pitched the opener, but was hit hard by the Minnesota Twins.

In Game 2 Koufax pitched six innings, giving up two runs, and the Twins won 5–1 to take an early 2–0 lead in the series. The Dodgers fought back in Games 3 and 4, with wins by Claude Osteen and Drysdale. With the Series tied at 2–2, Koufax pitched a complete-game shutout in Game 5 for a 3–2 Dodgers lead as the Series returned to Metropolitan Stadium for Game 6, which the Twins won to force a seventh game. Starting Game 7 on just two days of rest, Koufax pitched through fatigue and arthritic pain. Despite giving up on his curveball early in the game after failing to throw strikes with it in the first two innings, and pitching the rest of the game relying almost entirely on fastballs, Koufax threw a three-hit shutout to clinch the Series. The performance earned him his second World Series MVP award, making him the first player to win the award twice. Koufax also won the Hickok Belt a second time, the first time anyone had won the belt more than once. He was awarded Sports Illustrated magazine's Sportsman of the Year award.

1966 season

Holdout
Before the 1966 season began, Koufax and Drysdale met separately with general manager Buzzie Bavasi to negotiate their contracts for the upcoming year. After the meeting, the pitchers met for dinner, with Koufax complaining that Bavasi was using his teammate against him in the negotiations, taunting, "How come you want that much when Drysdale only wants this much?" Drysdale responded that Bavasi had done the same thing with him, in reverse. Drysdale's wife Ginger suggested that they negotiate together to get what they wanted. They demanded $1 million (equivalent to $ million in ), divided equally over the next three years, or $167,000 (equivalent to $ million in ) each for each of the next three seasons. Both players were represented by an entertainment lawyer, J. William Hayes, which was unusual in an era when players were not even represented by agents. At the time, Willie Mays was the highest paid player in the major leagues at $125,000 (equivalent to $ million in ) per year, and multi-year contracts were extremely unusual.

Koufax and Drysdale did not report to spring training in February. Instead, both signed to appear in the movie Warning Shot, starring David Janssen. Drysdale was to play a TV commentator and Koufax a detective. Meanwhile, the Dodgers waged a public relations battle against them. After four weeks, Koufax gave Drysdale the go-ahead to negotiate new deals for both of them. Koufax ended up getting $125,000 and Drysdale $110,000 (equivalent to $ million in ). They rejoined the team in the last week of spring training.
In April 1966, Kerlan told Koufax it was time to retire and that his arm could not take another season. Koufax kept Kerlan's advice to himself and went out every fourth day to pitch. He ended up with a third pitcher's Triple Crown, pitching 323 innings, posting a 27–9 record, and recording a 1.73 ERA. Since then, no left-hander has had more wins, nor a lower ERA; only Phillies pitcher Steve Carlton matched the 27-win mark, in 1972. In the final game of the regular season, the Dodgers had to beat the Phillies to win the pennant. In the second game of a doubleheader, Koufax faced Jim Bunning for the second time that season, in a match-up between perfect game winners. On two days rest, Koufax pitched a 6-3 complete-game victory to clinch the pennant. He started 41 games (for the second year in a row); only two left-handers have started more games in any season over the ensuing years through 2021.

Season
The Dodgers went on to face the Baltimore Orioles in the World Series, and Game 2 marked Koufax's third start in eight days. He pitched well enough—Baltimore first baseman Boog Powell told Koufax's biographer, Jane Leavy, "He might have been hurtin' but he was bringin'"—but three errors by Dodger center fielder Willie Davis in the fifth inning produced three unearned runs. Baltimore's 20-year-old future Hall of Famer Jim Palmer pitched a four-hitter, and the Orioles won 6–0. Alston lifted Koufax at the end of the sixth  with the idea of getting him extra rest before a potential fifth game. Instead, the Dodgers were swept in four games, not scoring a single run in the last  In his three World Series losses, all starts, spread over three different Series, Koufax gave up a total of three earned runs; the Dodgers scored a total of one run in support in all three. Less than six weeks after the series, on Friday,  Koufax announced his retirement due to an arthritic elbow.

Career overall
In his 12-season major league career, Koufax had a 165–87 record with a 2.76 ERA, 2,396 strikeouts, 137 complete games, and 40 shutouts. He was the first pitcher to average fewer than seven hits allowed per nine innings pitched (6.79) and to strike out more than nine batters (9.28) per nine innings pitched. He also became the second pitcher in baseball history to have two games with 18 or more strikeouts, and the first to have eight games with 15 or more strikeouts. In his last ten seasons, from 1957 to 1966, batters hit .203 against him, with a .271 on-base percentage and a .315 slugging average.

Due to a lack of run support, Koufax's postseason won-lost record over four World Series is an unimpressive 4–3, but his historic 0.95 ERA and two World Series MVPs testify to how well he actually pitched. He remains, over half a century later, on the very short list of pitchers who retired with more career strikeouts than innings pitched. He was selected as an All-Star for six consecutive seasons and made seven out of eight possible All-Star Game appearances those seasons (he was not on the roster for the second All-Star Game in 1962). He pitched six innings in four All-Star games, including being the starting pitcher for three innings in the 1966 All-Star Game.

Koufax was the first pitcher to win multiple Cy Young Awards, an especially impressive feat because it was during the era when only one was given out for both major leagues. He is also the first pitcher to win the award by a unanimous vote—a recognition which he accomplished twice more. Koufax and Juan Marichal are the only two pitchers to have more than one 25-win season in the post-World War II era, with each man recording three.

Pitching style

Koufax threw with a pronounced straight-over-the-top arm action. This aided in his devastating curveball and may have increased his velocity, but reduced the lateral movement on his pitches, especially movement away from left-handed hitters. Most of his velocity came from his strong legs and back, combined with a high leg kick during his wind-up and long forward extension on his release point toward home plate. Throughout his career, Koufax relied heavily on two pitches. His four-seam fastball gave batters the impression of rising as it approached them, due to backspin. It not only appeared to move very late but also might move on multiple planes. His overhand curveball, spun with the middle finger, dropped vertically 12 to 24 inches due to his arm action. Sabermetrician Rob Neyer called it the best curve of all time. He also occasionally threw a changeup and a forkball.

At the beginning of his career Koufax fought a tendency to "tip" pitches to the opposing team through variations in his wind-up, which included the position in which he held his hands at the top of the wind-up. When throwing a fastball with baserunners, his hand position in the stretch would be higher than when he threw a curveball. Once alerted, he made an effort to better disguise his deliveries. Late in his career, his tendency to tip pitches became even more pronounced. Good hitters could often predict what pitch was coming, but were still unable to hit it. Willie Mays said, "I knew every pitch he was going to throw – fastball, breaking ball or whatever. Actually, he would let you look at it. And you still couldn't hit it."

Post-playing career
In 1967, Koufax signed a 10-year contract with NBC for US$1 million (equivalent to $ million in ) to be a broadcaster on the Saturday Game of the Week. He quit after six years, just prior to the start of the 1973 season.

Koufax returned to the Dodger organization in  when the Dodgers were sold to Frank McCourt. The Dodgers again hired Koufax in 2013 as a special advisor to team chairman Mark Walter to work with the pitchers during spring training and consult during the season.

Legacy

Koufax was elected to the Baseball Hall of Fame in his first year of eligibility, 1972, just weeks after his 36th birthday. He was the youngest player ever elected, five months younger than Lou Gehrig upon his special election in December 1939 (which waived what was then a one-year waiting period before enshrinement). However, due to changes in Hall practices, the 1972 induction ceremony was nearly eight months after the election, leaving Koufax slightly older than Gehrig, who had no formal induction ceremony, at the time of his induction. On June 4 of that year, Koufax's uniform number 32 was retired alongside those of Dodger greats Roy Campanella (39) and Jackie Robinson (42). In 2022, a statue of Koufax was unveiled at Dodger Stadium.

In , The Sporting News placed Koufax at number 26 on its list of "Baseball's 100 Greatest Players". He was also named that year as one of the 30 players on the Major League Baseball All-Century Team. Although he rarely makes public appearances, he went to Turner Field in Atlanta for the introduction ceremony before Game 2 of the 1999 World Series.

In 1990 Koufax was inducted into the Southern California Jewish Sports Hall of Fame. He was the final player chosen in the inaugural Israel Baseball League draft in April 2007, picked, at 71 years old, by the Modi'in Miracle. "His selection is a tribute to the esteem with which he is held by everyone associated with this league", said former New York Met Art Shamsky, who managed the Miracle. "It's been 41 years between starts for him. If he's rested and ready to take the mound again, we want him on our team." Koufax declined the offer.

Before the 2015 MLB All-Star Game in Cincinnati, Koufax was introduced as one of the four best living players (as selected by fans), along with Willie Mays, Hank Aaron and Johnny Bench. He threw the ceremonial first pitch to Bench from in front of the base of the mound.

Koufax was included among a group of prominent Jewish Americans honored at a May 27, 2010, White House reception for Jewish American Heritage Month. During welcome remarks in a reminiscence of Koufax's decision not to play on the Jewish holy day of Yom Kippur, President Barack Obama said that the two had "something in common." Obama continued: "He can't pitch on Yom Kippur. I can't pitch." Obama directly acknowledged the high esteem in which Koufax is held: "This is a ... pretty distinguished group," he said of the invited guests, which included members of the House and Senate, two justices of the Supreme Court, Olympic athletes, entrepreneurs, rabbinical scholars, "and Sandy Koufax." The mention of his name brought the biggest cheer at the event.

Personal life
Koufax has been described by Sports Illustrated writer John Rosengren as a secular Jew. Regardless, his decision to not pitch on Yom Kippur in 1965 was highly significant for Jewish-Americans. In addition, there were other Jewish holidays where he said he would not pitch, including Seder night of Passover and 3 times on Rosh Hashanah, one of which was Game 4 of the 1959 World Series.

Author Larry Ruttman called Koufax "an icon" for Jewish people because of his pitching skill and what he called Koufax's "deep respect for his Judaism" as shown in 1965.

Koufax married Anne Widmark, the daughter of actor Richard Widmark, in 1969; they divorced in 1982. His second marriage, to personal trainer Kimberly Francis, lasted from 1985 to 1998. Neither marriage produced children. His third wife is Jane Dee Purucker Clarke, a college sorority sister of First Lady Laura Bush. Koufax is the stepfather of Clarke's daughter from her prior marriage to artist John Clem Clarke.

Koufax serves as a member of the advisory board of the Baseball Assistance Team, a non-profit organization dedicated to helping former major league, minor league, and Negro league players through financial and medical difficulties.

Career statistics

See also

List of Major League Baseball annual ERA leaders
List of Major League Baseball annual strikeout leaders
List of Major League Baseball annual wins leaders
List of Major League Baseball single-game strikeout leaders
List of Major League Baseball career strikeout leaders
List of Major League Baseball career WHIP leaders
List of Major League Baseball perfect games
List of Major League Baseball no-hitters
List of Major League Baseball players who spent their entire career with one franchise
Major League Baseball titles leaders
List of baseball players who went directly to Major League Baseball
List of select Jewish baseball players
List of SN Player of the Year
List of SN Pitcher of the Year

Notes

References
 
 
 
 
 
 
 
 
 
 
 
 Pietrusza, David; Silverman, Matthew & Gershman, Michael, ed. (2000). Baseball: The Biographical Encyclopedia. Total/Sports Illustrated. .
 Ruttman, Larry. "Sandy Koufax: Pitcher Nonpareil and Perfect Gentleman". In American Jews and America's Game: Voices of a Growing Legacy in Baseball, University of Nebraska Press, 2013,

Further reading
 Lieber, Leslie. "Who's the Fastest Pitcher". Washington Star. June 19, 1960. pp. 11–12
 "Close-Up: Good Life of Baseball's Number 1 Hero". Life. October 22, 1963. pp. 54–56.
 Gross, Milton. "Baseball's Fragile Superstars". Popular Science. May 1966. pp. 76–79.
 Linn, Ed. "Sandy Koufax – Best Pitcher of All". Boy's Life'. March 1967. pp. 28–31.
 Brosnan, Jim. "Baseball's Greatest Pitcher". Boy's Life. February 1979. pp. 25–27. 
 Verducci, Tom. "The Left Arm of God". Sports Illustrated. July 12, 1999.
 Mott, Patrick. "Bon Mott: Sandy's Shrine". Orange Coast Magazine''. March 2000. p. 16.

External links

Sandy Koufax at SABR (Baseball BioProject)

Sandy Koufax - Baseballbiography.com
A Pair of Tefillin for Sandy Koufax – article from Chabad.org about the impact of Koufax's decision not to pitch on Yom Kippur on the Jewish community

Living people
1935 births
Major League Baseball pitchers
Los Angeles Dodgers players
Brooklyn Dodgers players
National Baseball Hall of Fame inductees
International Jewish Sports Hall of Fame inductees
National League All-Stars
National League Most Valuable Player Award winners
Cy Young Award winners
World Series Most Valuable Player Award winners
National League Pitching Triple Crown winners
National League wins champions
National League strikeout champions
National League ERA champions
Major League Baseball pitchers who have pitched a perfect game
Major League Baseball players with retired numbers
Baseball players from New York (state)
Jewish Major League Baseball players
Los Angeles Dodgers executives
Major League Baseball broadcasters
Cincinnati Bearcats baseball players
Cincinnati Bearcats men's basketball players
Basketball players from New York City
Columbia University School of General Studies alumni
Lafayette High School (New York City) alumni
Jewish American baseball players
20th-century American Jews
21st-century American Jews
Sportspeople from Brooklyn
Baseball players from New York City
People from Bensonhurst, Brooklyn
People from Borough Park, Brooklyn
People from Hidden Hills, California
People from Rockville Centre, New York
People from Vero Beach, Florida